is a Super Famicom sequel to Mario's Picross. The game is compatible with the Super Famicom Mouse. Developed by Jupiter and Ape and published by Nintendo.

After the failure of Mario's Picross in North America, Nintendo decided not to release this game in that region. The game was made available for download on the Wii's Virtual Console service on December 19, 2006, in Japan and later in PAL regions on September 14, 2007, the 12th anniversary of the game's original Japanese release - marking the first Western release of the game, which has been left nontranslated with original Japanese text intact. This game was re-released for download on the Wii U's Virtual Console service in both Japan and the PAL regions on April 27, 2013. It was made available worldwide on Nintendo Switch Online in September 2020.

Gameplay
Gameplay remains the same as in Mario's Picross, where the player must decipher the picture in each level, progressing to harder and harder puzzles. However, after completing the first level the player may also play "as" Wario, who presents a different challenge due to changes in the gameplay.

Each game is played against the clock. Opposing the picross tradition of black and white squares, the puzzles are set in stone and are picked out by Mario with a hammer and chisel. When the player solves a puzzle correctly, the black-and-white representation becomes colored and animated, and the game shows the player the title of the puzzle. When the player finishes a level, Mario will congratulate them on their progress and either bow (in the first and last levels) or give a thumbs up (in all other levels).

The player must work through levels in order to get access to harder levels, with more rows and columns. In Mario's puzzles, if the player marks an incorrect cell, they receive a time penalty. The amount of time lost doubles for every mistake (one minute, two minutes, four, and finally eight). In Wario's puzzles, the time counts up from zero, and the player is not penalized for marking an incorrect cell. However, the player will not be notified if they make a mistake.

Reception

Notes

References

External links

1995 video games
Jupiter (company) games
Nonograms
Video game sequels
Picross (video game series)
Super Nintendo Entertainment System games
Video games developed in Japan
Virtual Console games
Virtual Console games for Wii U
Mario puzzle games
Single-player video games
Nintendo Switch Online games